Elections for Barking and Dagenham London Borough Council, UK were held on 2 May 2002 to elect members to the council. All seats were up for election following boundary changes since the last election in 1998. The Labour Party easily kept overall control of the council. Overall turnout was 22.76%.

Background
100 candidates nominated in total. Labour again ran a full slate (51) and was the only party to do so. By contrast the Conservative Party ran only 12 candidates , whilst the Liberal Democrats ran 28.

Election result

|}

Ward results

Abbey

Alibon

Becontree

Chadwell Heath

Eastbrook

Eastbury

Gascoigne

Goresbrook

Heath

Longbridge

Mayesbrook

Parsloes

River

Thames

Valence

Village

Whalebone

By-elections between 2002 and 2006

Longbridge

The by-election was called following the death of Cllr. Susan Bramley.

Eastbrook

The by-election was called following the death of Cllr. Lawrence Bunn and the resignation of Cllr. Sidney Summerfield.

Eastbury

The by-election was called following the death of Cllr. Daniel J. Felton

Chadwell Heath

The by-election was called following the death of Cllr. Robert Jeyes.

Valence

The by-election was called following the death of Cllr. Vera W. Cridland.

Goresbrook

The by-election was called following the resignation of Cllr. Matthew W. Huggins.

Village

The by-election was called following the death of Cllr. Darrin F. Best.

Becontree

The by-election was called following the death of Cllr. John Wainwright.

Goresbrook

The by-election was called following the resignation of Cllr. Daniel G. Kelly.

References

2002
2002 London Borough council elections